Jerome Kendrick Pate (born September 16, 1953) is an American professional golfer on the PGA Tour Champions, formerly on the PGA Tour. As a 22-year-old rookie, he won the U.S. Open in 1976.

Early years
Born in Macon, Georgia, Pate grew up in the panhandle of Florida at Pensacola. He attended the University of Alabama in Tuscaloosa and played on its Crimson Tide golf team. A few weeks later, he tied Walker Cup teammate Jay Haas of Wake Forest for low amateur at the U.S. Open, finishing in a six-way tie for eighteenth place at Medinah, outside Chicago.

PGA Tour
Pate turned professional in 1975, and was the medalist at the PGA Tour Qualifying Tournament at Orlando in November. During his rookie season in 1976, he won the U.S. Open, his only major championship victory, and the Canadian Open, where he closed with a 63 to win by four strokes over runner-up Jack Nicklaus. Pate was selected as the Rookie of the Year and Co-Player of the Year.

Six more tour victories followed between 1977 and 1982, as well as several other titles around the world.  He was a member of the  victorious Ryder Cup team in 1981, but shoulder injuries curtailed his career; his final win on the PGA Tour came at age 28. That final victory was the Tournament Players Championship in 1982, the first held at TPC at Sawgrass. Pate celebrated by throwing course designer Pete Dye and PGA Tour commissioner Deane Beman into the lake adjacent to the 18th green, then jumped in himself. He had also jumped in the water after a victory the previous June, after going nearly three years without a win.

Later years
Pate later served as a broadcast analyst (ABC, CBS, BBC) and set up a golf course design practice and a turf and irrigation company. During the years between his regular and senior careers, Pate returned to the University of Alabama to complete his bachelor's degree in administrative science; his daughter, Jenni, received her degree at the same graduation ceremony in 2001.  He designed the Kiva Dunes in 1995 and the Ol' Colony Golf Complex in 2000, which is the home course for the Alabama Crimson Tide golf team. In 2006, he earned his first Champions Tour win at the Outback Steakhouse Pro-Am. Pate has been forced by health problems, including arthroscopic left-knee surgery in 2010, to begin limiting his Champions Tour appearances.

Amateur wins
1974 U.S. Amateur

Professional wins (15)

PGA Tour wins (8)

PGA Tour playoff record (1–2)

Japan Golf Tour wins (2)

South American Golf Circuit wins (2)

Other wins (1)

Champions Tour wins (2)

Champions Tour playoff record (0–1)

Major championships

Wins (1)

Results timeline

LA = Low amateur
CUT = missed the halfway cut (3rd round cut in 1976 Open Championship)
WD = withdrew
"T" indicates a tie for a place.

Summary

Most consecutive cuts made – 7 (1980 Open Championship – 1982 Masters)
Longest streak of top-10s – 2 (twice)

The Players Championship

Wins (1)

Results timeline

CUT = missed the halfway cut
"T" indicates a tie for a place.

U.S. national team appearances
Amateur
Eisenhower Trophy: 1974 (team winners and joint individual leader)
Walker Cup: 1975 (winners)

Professional
Ryder Cup: 1981 (winners)
World Cup: 1976

See also 

 Fall 1975 PGA Tour Qualifying School graduates

References

External links

American male golfers
Alabama Crimson Tide men's golfers
PGA Tour golfers
PGA Tour Champions golfers
Ryder Cup competitors for the United States
Winners of men's major golf championships
Golf writers and broadcasters
Golf course architects
Golfers from Georgia (U.S. state)
Golfers from Florida
Sportspeople from Macon, Georgia
Sportspeople from Pensacola, Florida
1953 births
Living people